The 2009 Texas A&M Aggies football team (often referred to as "A&M" or the "Aggies") represented Texas A&M University in the 2009 NCAA Division I FBS football season. The team was led by second-year head coach Mike Sherman and played their home games at Kyle Field in College Station, Texas. The Aggies finished the season 6–7, 3–5 in Big 12 play and lost in the Independence Bowl 44–20 against Georgia.

This would be the Aggies' last losing season until 2022.

Pre-season

Pre-season All-Big 12 honors
No A&M players were listed in the Media Preseason All-Big 12 team

Pre-season watchlists
Cyrus Gray – 2009 Doak Walker Award Nominee
Jamie McCoy – 2009 John Mackey Award Watch List

Schedule
Phil Steele ranked A&M's strength of schedule 41st.

Coaching staff

Game summaries

New Mexico

The A&M defense showed considerable improvement since the previous season. The defense registered five sacks, three of which came from Von Miller, who played the jack position. In the 2008 season, Miller finished with only 3½ sacks, while the whole defense produced a combined 16. Jerrod Johnson completed 31 of 41 pass attempts for 349 yards to 10 different receivers. The team also lost 123 yards due to 14 penalties, a statistic Sherman was not happy about.

Utah State

During the second quarter, wide receiver Jeff Fuller suffered a leg injury while attempting to make a catch, and is expected to miss 4–6 weeks. Running back Christine Michael, who rushed for 94 yards, strained his left calf muscle during the third quarter, though should be able to return to practice the following week. A&M did not improve their penalty issues from the season opener, as they were flagged 16 times for 147 yards. The defense also gave up 521 yards to Utah State.

One of the positive aspects of the game was wide receiver Uzoma "EZ" Nwachukwu, who caught three touchdowns and rushed for one. He broke the Aggie freshman single-game touchdown record, which was last set by Leeland McElroy in 1993.

UAB

Arkansas

Oklahoma State

Oklahoma State lost key players Dez Bryant, who was suspended indefinitely, and Kendall Hunter, who had an injury. The Cowboys also lost 118 yards due to penalties, but were still able to win the game.

Kansas State

Texas Tech

A&M picked up its first win at Tech since 1993. Tech was ranked #21 in the AP Poll and #24 in the Coaches Poll heading into the game. The Aggies also defeated the Red Raiders in front of a then record-crowd of 57,733.

Iowa State

Colorado

Oklahoma

Baylor

The Aggies became bowl eligible for the first time since 2007 with a win over Baylor. In the second quarter, freshman running back Christine Michael ran for a 97-yard touchdown, breaking an A&M record for the longest play from scrimmage. The Aggies ran for 375 yards, and for the second time in the season, running backs Cyrus Gray and Christine Michael both ran for over 100 yards. Another record was broken in the third quarter, with Jerrod Johnson breaking Reggie McNeal's record for passing yards in a season.

Texas

Georgia–Independence Bowl

References

Texas AandM
Texas A&M Aggies football seasons
Texas AandM Aggies football